The 1944–45 international cricket season was from September 1944 to April 1945. However, there were no any Test matches held during this period, except few domestic competitions due to prevailing Second World War.

Season overview

April

India in Ceylon

References

International cricket competitions by season
1944 in cricket
1945 in cricket